Algeria elects on the national level a head of state – the president – and a legislature. The president is elected for a five-year term by the people. People's National Assembly (Assemblée Populaire Nationale) has 407 members, elected for a five-year term in multi-seat constituencies by proportional representation. Eight seats in the national assembly are reserved for Algerians abroad. The Council of the Nation (Conseil de la nation) has 144 members, 96 members elected by communal councils and 48 members appointed by the president. 
Algeria has a multi-party system, with numerous political parties in which no one party often has a chance of gaining power alone, and parties must work with each other to form coalition governments. According to a US Embassy cable, the 2009 presidential elections were "carefully choreographed and heavily controlled", with the official turnout figure "exaggerated" by at least 45%.

Until 12 November 2008, presidents were limited to two terms; on this date, amendments to the constitution were passed which removed the term limits. Term limits were later reinstated in the 2016 constitution reform by President Abdelaziz Bouteflika.

The last legislative election was held on 12 June 2021.

Latest elections

Presidential election

Legislative elections

See also
Electoral calendar
Electoral system

References

External links
Adam Carr's Election Archive
True Election via Web